Segun Awosanya, known as Segalink, is a Nigerian realtor, human rights activist and business consultant.

Awosanya was one of the early organisers (advocates) of the campaign against police brutality in Nigeria using social media as a tool, while engaging authorities across arms of government with #EndSARS #ReformPoliceNG advocacy, which yielded results when the Buhari-led government of Nigeria announced a total overhaul of the department of Special Anti-Robbery Squad, popularly known as SARS.

Career 
Awosanya is the founder and president of the Social Intervention Advocacy Foundation (SIAF). He is also the founder and executive director of ALIENSMEDIA (a futuristic brand regarding identity media, technology and brand strategy consultancy). He has continued to freely educate and enlighten the public through Twitter with successful direct intervention in bridging institutional gaps between the people and government institutions.

Awosanya consults for several firms, government and non-governmental organizations in Nigeria on technology, business strategy, strategic communication, real estate investments/wealth management, personal development, crisis/perception management, soft skills and media matters.

Awosanya facilitated and influenced the Nigerian socio-political space from 2014 till date through various advocacies. The most popular among them is #EndSARS, which focuses on the reformation of the criminal justice system via legislative reforms and a scrap of the rogue arm of the police (SARS) that is currently threatening the sovereignty of the country and the general sanctity of our society.

In the aftermath of the #EndSARS protest in Nigeria,  Awosanya  was listed as a member of the Lagos State Judiciary Panel of Inquiry by the Lagos State Governor Babajide Sanwo-Olu on police brutality in Lagos State.

References

Living people
End SARS activists
Nigerian human rights activists
Nigerian real estate brokers
University of Lagos alumni
Yaba College of Technology alumni
Year of birth missing (living people)